A tame bear, often called a dancing bear, is a wild bear captured when young, or born and bred in captivity, and used to entertain people in streets or taverns. Dancing bears were commonplace throughout Europe and Asia from the Middle Ages to the 19th century, and can still be found in the 21st century in some countries.

Dancing bears

History
In Ancient Rome, bears and monkeys were led to dance and perform tricks for the public. Dancing bears were commonplace in the Indian subcontinent for centuries. The last of them were freed in 2009.

In Russia and Siberia, cubs were for centuries captured for being used as dancing bears accompanying tavern musicians (skomorokhi), as depicted in the Travels of Adam Olearius.
Dancing bears were widespread throughout Europe from the Middle Ages to the 19th century. They were still present on the streets of Spain in 2007, and in Eastern Europe.

Recently, organizations and animal rights activists have worked to outlaw or eliminate tame bears, since the practice is seen as cruel and antiquated, citing mistreatment and abuse used in order to train the bears.

French bear handlers 
Traveling with a bear was very popular in France at the end of the 19th century, between 1870 and 1914. More than 600 men from Ariege in the French Pyrenees trained a bear cub found in the mountains near their home. Among them, 200 traveled to North America arriving at the ports of New York, Quebec, Montreal and Halifax from the ports of Liverpool, Glasgow and Belfast. They would leave their home early in spring, walking from the Pyrenees through France and England, earning money for the crossing in order to arrive in North America in May or June.

Gallery

In popular culture 
 The popular children's television show, Captain Kangaroo , featured a character known as "Dancing Bear."
 The concept has entered into the lexicon in the form of the common proverb; "The marvel is not that the bear dances well, but that the bear dances at all."
 Randy Newman's song "Simon Smith and the Amazing Dancing Bear" is about a humble young man who entertains high society with his tame bear.
 A dancing bear features at the end of Cormac McCarthy’s 1985 Western novel Blood Meridian  and is shot in a saloon by a drunkard.
 In The Simpsons episode “Marge on the Lam,” Homer Simpson and Lenny Leonard both misremember ballet as “the bear in the little car.”
 Rafi Zabor's novel The Bear Comes Home is a fictional story about a bear trained to play jazz saxophone.
 The Joanna Newsom song “Monkey & Bear” concerns a bear named Ursala who is deceived by the Monkey into dancing for children. 
 The animated movie Madagascar 3: Europe's Most Wanted features a bear named Sonya who is trained to ride a unicycle. Sonya is considerably more animalistic than the other anthropomorphic animals in the film.

See also
Iomante
The Bear Comes Home
Ursari
Bear-baiting
Corbinian's Bear
Wojtek (bear)

References

Bears
Animal rights
Animals in entertainment
Animal training
Cruelty to animals